Şerif Kılıç (born 26 September 1993) is a Turkish Greco-Roman wrestler. He is a silver medalist at the 2020 Individual Wrestling World Cup.

Career 

Serif Kilic captured silver medal in men's Greco-Roman 55 kg at 2020 Individual World Cup.

References

External links
 

1993 births
Living people
Place of birth missing (living people)
Turkish male sport wrestlers
20th-century Turkish people
21st-century Turkish people